Samangan may refer to:

Afghanistan 

 Samangan Province of Afghanistan
 Aybak, Samangan, the capital of Samangan Province

Iran 

Samangan, Kermanshah
 Samangan-e Olya, Kermanshah Province
 Samangan-e Sofla, Kermanshah Province
 Samangan, Fars
 Samangan, Firuzabad, Fars Province
 Samangan, Quchan, Razavi Khorasan Province
 Samangan, Taybad, Razavi Khorasan Province
 Samangan, Torbat-e Jam, Razavi Khorasan Province
 Samangan railway station, a station in Markazi Province on the Rahahane Gharb line
 Sirjan, previously Samangan, capital of Sirjan County, Kerman Province